Paige Craig (born 1975) is a venture capitalist and general partner at Arena Ventures, a founder-focused, seed stage venture capital firm based in Los Angeles.

Early life and education

He began his career in the military in 1992, where he went to West Point, ultimately becoming a cadet. In 1995, he dropped out of West Point and enlisted in the United States Marine Corps with his time in the Marines strongly influencing the development of his '33 principles for investment' He got his undergraduate in Information Technology from the University of Maryland, later earning an M.B.A from National University.

Career

He enlisted in the Marines and was promoted to sergeant before leaving the service in 2000. After the Invasion of Iraq in 2003, he created the Lincoln Group and started winning Pentagon contracts to assist with "psychological operations". In 2007, he sold his share of the Lincoln Group and moved to Los Angeles in 2008. From 2010 to 2012, he was the CEO and cofounder of BetterWorks, whose mission was to help smaller companies create office cultures of offering abundant perks. In May 2012, in what he described as the "lowest point of his professional career", he shut down the company and returned the remaining capital to his investor.

He became an angel investor to over 110 startups from 2008 to 2015. He acquired an early-stage portfolio that included Airbnb, Lyft, AngelList, Postmates, and Klout.

Craig currently leads Arena Ventures.

References

External links

Identifying a Company's Vision on Venturi-Group

American venture capitalists
1975 births
Living people